Maryland University of Integrative Health (MUIH), formerly the Tai Sophia Institute, is a private graduate school of alternative medicine in Laurel, Maryland. It is accredited by the Middle States Commission on Higher Education and has an academic and clinical focus on whole person, relationship-centered healthcare.

History 

The university was founded by Dianne Connelly and Robert Duggan in 1974 as the College of Chinese Acupuncture, U.S. In 1978, it was renamed Traditional Acupuncture Institute to train acupuncturists. In 2000, it was renamed the Tai Sophia Institute and expanded its offerings to include other forms of traditional medicine, such as yoga, acupressure and herbalism. In 2003, the institute moved to the Montpelier Research Park in Fulton on the site of the Montpelier Mansion (circa 1740) which was razed by Maple Lawn developers in 1996. In 2013, the Institute received approval from the state to offer graduate degrees and changed its name to the Maryland University of Integrative Health (MUIH) on March 1, 2013.

Academics 
The university offers doctoral degrees, master's degrees, graduate certificates, post-master's certificates, post-bachelor's certificates, and continuing education in areas such as acupuncture, oriental medicine, holistic health, yoga therapy, and herbal studies.

References

External links
 

Acupuncture organizations
Herbalism organizations
Private universities and colleges in Maryland
Educational institutions established in 1974
Laurel, Maryland
1974 establishments in Maryland